David Johnson (born 28 October 1981) is a former Australian rules footballer for the Geelong Football Club in the Australian Football League (AFL).

Recruited from Calder Cannons, Johnson was renowned for his hard work ethic and aggressive play. He is the brother of former Essendon and Fremantle footballer Mark Johnson.

Career statistics
  Statistics are correct as of end of 2007 season

References

External links

1981 births
Living people
Australian rules footballers from Victoria (Australia)
Geelong Football Club players
Calder Cannons players